Maglite (also spelled Mag-Lite, stylized as MAG-LITE) is a brand of flashlight manufactured in the United States by Mag Instrument, Inc. located in Ontario, California, and founded by Anthony Maglica. It was introduced in 1979. Constructed principally of anodized 6061 aluminum, they have a variable-focus beam. Maglites are produced in several colors such as black, silver, blue, red, green, purple, gold, and different finishes. Originally  Maglite flashlights used krypton or xenon incandescent bulbs. Current models have LEDs, although the older models are still widely available.

Accessories include belt holsters, mounting brackets, colored and glass lenses, attachable fiber optics extensions to bend light output into a cramped space, higher-powered incandescent bulbs, and LED conversion modules. The Maglite was an improvement over the Kel-Lite, after which the Maglite was patterned.

Timeline

A list of the sizes of Mag Instrument flashlights, and the years they were released:

 1979: D and C battery models are put on the market; targeted to the public safety and industrial sectors (the 5C, 6C, 7C and 7D models are out of production)
 1982: MagCharger: a larger more expensive model popular with public safety and emergency-services personnel. This light is much brighter than typical Maglites, and uses an incandescent Halogen bulb  and a rechargeable NiCad or NiMH battery pack.
 1984: Two AA cell batteries (Mini Maglite) Maglite's first personal size flashlight
 1987: Two AAA cell batteries (Mini Maglite) A smaller version of the original Mini Maglite
 1988: One AAA cell battery (Maglite Solitaire) Mag Instrument's key chain flashlight.
 2006: Maglite LED Flashlight and Upgrade Module: 3-watt Luxeon III LED from Lumileds.
 2006: Mini Maglite LED 2AA.
 2008: MagCharger: Upgraded Nickel/Metal Hydride (NiMH) battery pack increases charge time and second generation Halogen bulb increases light output.
 2009: Next Generation Mag-LED Technology: Featuring a new Luxeon Rebel LED and extended battery life.
 2010: Maglite XL100: offers a motion-controlled user interface using a built-in accelerometer
 2010: Maglite XL50: This is a simpler version of the XL100, featuring three modes that can be activated with consecutive presses of the tailcap switch. The XL50 will have a lower retail price than the XL100.
 2011: A variety of LED and rechargeable flashlights introduced. These include the ML100 and the rechargeable/C Cell LED ML125
 2011: Maglite XL200: This is similar to the XL100 but offers higher lumen output.
 2012: Mini Maglite AA Pro 215 Lumens and Mini Maglite AA Pro+ 245 Lumens. 
 2012: Maglite 2D pro 274 Lumens with a Cree XP-G rather than a Cree XP-E, increasing brightness while decreasing beam distance efficiency.
 2012: Maglite Mag-Tac flashlight plain bezel, 310 Lumens, low mode at around 100 Lumens. First Maglite flashlight to use CR123A batteries. Tactical style designed with military input.
 2012: Maglite Mag-Tac crowned bezel, 320 lumens. This model has no low mode for light output.
 2012: The V4 was released with a newly developed electronic switch enabling a Multi Mode operation and a slightly more powerful bulb producing an output of 245 Lumens. 
 2012: In August, Maglite announced several new models including an LED version of the Solitaire, a Mini Maglite LED 2 AAA and a new version of the 2D LED termed the 2D LED Pro promising a beam in excess of 200 Lumens.
 2013: Maglite released an LED version of the MagCharger. Features a 680 lumen output and spot-to-flood beam with a quarter turn of the head. Claimed 4 hrs of battery life on a full charge at full power. Other specs are as the Incandescent Version.

Models

Law enforcement use
Maglite flashlights have been known to be used as a ready substitute for a baton.  In 2004, the Los Angeles Police Commission moved to use smaller flashlights, with Alan Skobin, the commission vice-president, stating that "This policy makes clear flashlights are for illumination and discourages their use as an impact tool. And it ensures officer safety as well as protects the public." Security and police personnel often carry Maglite flashlights in red as they can be employed as a defensive weapon, especially at night or in dark locations.

On March 30, 2007, the Los Angeles Police Department announced that they would be switching to a smaller, lighter LED flashlight that cannot be used as a baton, in response to a highly publicized incident where an officer was accused of using excessive force against a suspect by using a Maglite.

Gallery

References

External links

 
 Complete disassembly of a 2D Maglite flashlight with a xenon bulb
Maglite's Tony Maglica: Torchbearer of the American Dream

American brands
Flashlights
Goods manufactured in the United States
Lighting brands
Manufacturing companies based in California
Products introduced in 1979